The Philadelphia White Stockings were an early professional baseball team.  They were a member of the National Association from 1873 to 1875.  Their home games were played at the Jefferson Street Grounds.  They were managed by Fergy Malone, Jimmy Wood, Bill Craver, Mike McGeary, and Bob Addy.

During their three-year existence the White Stockings won 102 games and lost 77 for a winning percentage of .570.

See also
 Philadelphia White Stockings all-time roster
 1873 Philadelphia White Stockings season
 1874 Philadelphia White Stockings season
 1875 Philadelphia White Stockings season

External links
Baseball Reference Team Index

 
Defunct National Association baseball teams
Defunct baseball teams in Pennsylvania
Defunct sports teams in Pennsylvania
1873 establishments in Pennsylvania
Baseball teams disestablished in 1875
Baseball teams established in 1873